Dheeraj Rattan is a screenplay and story writer known for films like Mumbai Salsa and Haal-e-dil. 

He has worked with Vikram Bhatt on three successive horror films - 1920, Shaapit and Phirr. He made his screenplay and dialogue writing debut in the Punjabi film industry with Mel Karade Rabba with the cast Jimmy Shergill, Gippy Grewal and Neeru Bajwa, which went on to become the biggest Punjabi hit of that time. It collected Rs. 1.95 Crores in Punjab alone in the opening week.

Since then he has written several Punjabi blockbusters like Jatt & Juliet 1 and 2, Best of Luck and Romeo Ranjha. 

His films Shareek, Ambarsariya, Sardaar Ji 2, Kaptaan, and Jindua saw wide commercial success. His upcoming features include Maddock produced Kunal Deshmukh's Shiddat and RSVP's Bhangra Paa Le.

Career

After a stint as an Assistant Director in Bollywood in 2007, Rattan established his career as a screenplay and story writer with the films Mumbai Salsa and Haal-e-Dil. Between 2008 and 2011, he worked with Vikram Bhatt on three successive movies in the horror, mystery and thriller genres, namely 1920, Shaapit and Phhir. He simultaneously made his screenplay and dialogue writing debut in the Punjabi film industry with the movie Mel Karade Rabba, starring Jimmy Shergill, Gippy Grewal and Neeru Bajwa, which went on to become the biggest Punjabi hit of that time, with the highest opening day, weekend and week collections for any Punjabi film at the time of its release. It collected Rs 1.95 cr in Punjab alone in its opening week. 

Since then, Rattan has written several critically acclaimed and commercially successful blockbusters in Punjabi cinema, including Jatt & Juliet 1 & 2, Best of Luck and Romeo Ranjha. In addition to writing their scripts, with the films Saadi Love Story and Ishq Garaari, he also made his directorial debut, which was widely received with appreciation and positive responses from critics and masses alike. His film Shareek, released in October 2015, is a hit family drama directed by Navaniat Singh, starring Jimmy Shergill, Mahie Gill and Guggu Gill, produced under the banner of Ohri Productions and Green Planet Productions. His last release Ambarsariya, starring Diljit Dosanjh and Lauren Gottlieb was a blockbuster hit in India and abroad.

His 2016 releases Sardaar Ji 2 starring Diljit Dosanjh and Sonam Bajwa, and Kaptaan starring Gippy Grewal and Monica Gill, were eagerly awaited.

Filmography

References

External links
 

21st-century Indian film directors
Indian male screenwriters
Living people
1974 births
Hindi screenwriters